The 2015 Mid-American Conference (MAC) softball tournament will be held at Firestone Stadium in Akron, Ohio, home of Akron University, from May 6 through May 9, 2015. The tournament winner will earn the Mid-American Conference's automatic bid to the 2015 NCAA Division I softball tournament. All games will be streamed via mac-sports.com.

Tournament

All times listed are Eastern Daylight Time.

References

Mid-American Conference softball tournament
Mid-American Conference